Science was a general science magazine published by the American Association for the Advancement of Science (AAAS) from 1979 to 1986. It was intended to "bridge the distance between science and citizen", aimed at a technically literate audience who may not work professionally in the sciences. The AAAS also publishes the famous science journal Science, the similar name leading to some confusion.

Science was first issued as Science 80 in November 1979 and was originally published bi-monthly and by subscription only. The name of the magazine changed every year to reflect the publication date, becoming Science 81, Science 82, etc.  The magazine was similar to Discover in terms of coverage, but tended to offer longer articles and often a photoessay. Guest essays by a well-known scientist were a common feature as well. The magazine also offered a "Resources" section which contained references for the articles.

Like Discover, Science was aimed at readers looking for something more readable than the Scientific American of those days, which was a much more technical magazine than it became in the 1990s, but more in-depth and more artfully written than magazines like Popular Science, which tends to cover technology more than the science behind it. This market proved to be too small for the large number of magazines that attempted to serve it, and many disappeared during the mid-1980s. Science was purchased in 1986 by Time Inc. and folded into Discover, the last issue being July 1986. A few issues of Discover after the merger feature a stamp noting "Now including Science 86", but this quickly disappeared.

See also
 New Scientist
 OMNI
 Popular Mechanics
 Popular science
 Popular Science

References

American Association for the Advancement of Science
Bimonthly magazines published in the United States
Defunct magazines published in the United States
Magazines established in 1979
Magazines disestablished in 1986
Science and technology magazines published in the United States
Magazines published in Washington, D.C.